Allworth is a small village in New South Wales, Australia.

History
The Allworth Post Office, which was originally named New Wharf Post Office, opened on 15 July 1911 and closed on 14 March 1973.

References

Towns in the Hunter Region
Suburbs of Mid-Coast Council